Doris Kohardt (born 12 November 1950) is a retired East German swimmer. She competed at the 1968 Summer Olympics in the 200 m backstroke event, but failed to reach the final. Between 1967 and 1969 she won three national titles in the 100 m and 200 m backstroke.

References

1950 births
Living people
East German female swimmers
People from Rostock
Olympic swimmers of East Germany
Swimmers at the 1968 Summer Olympics
Female backstroke swimmers